Butterick may refer to:

 Butterick Publishing Company

People with the surname
Ebenezer Butterick (1826–1903), American tailor, inventor and businessman
Matthew Butterick, American typographer, lawyer and writer